This is a list of places in Moldova which have standing links to local communities in other countries known as "town twinning" (usually in Europe) or "sister cities" (usually in the rest of the world).

B
Bălți

 Arad, Israel
 Białystok, Poland
 Chernivtsi, Ukraine
 Comrat, Moldova
 İzmir, Turkey
 Khmelnytskyi, Ukraine
 Lakeland, United States
 Larissa, Greece
 Livny, Russia
 Miercurea Ciuc, Romania
 Mohyliv-Podilskyi, Ukraine
 Narva, Estonia
 Nizhny Novgorod, Russia
 Orsha, Belarus
 Płock, Poland
 Podolsk, Russia
 Polotsk, Belarus
 Pushkin, Russia
 Rechytsa, Belarus
 Stryi, Ukraine
 Vitebsk, Belarus
 Western AO (Moscow), Russia
 Wuzhong, China
 Zapadnoye Degunino (Moscow), Russia

C
Chișinău

 Alba Iulia, Romania
 Ankara, Turkey
 Borlänge, Sweden
 Bucharest, Romania
 Chernivtsi, Ukraine
 Grenoble, France
 Iași, Romania
 Kyiv, Ukraine
 Mannheim, Germany
 Minsk, Belarus
 Odesa, Ukraine
 Reggio Emilia, Italy
 Sacramento, United States
 Suceava, Romania
 Tbilisi, Georgia
 Tel Aviv, Israel
 Yerevan, Armenia

Comrat
 Bălți, Moldova

Copceac

 Byala, Bulgaria
 Bykhaw, Belarus
 General Kantardzhievo (Aksakovo), Bulgaria
 Raslavice, Slovakia
 Şarköy, Turkey
 Strumica, North Macedonia
 Tokmok, Kyrgyzstan
 Valu lui Traian, Romania

Criuleni
 Jurbarkas, Lithuania

E
Edineț

 Daugavpils Municipality, Latvia
 Râmnicu Sărat, Romania
 Rēzekne Municipality, Latvia
 Roman, Romania
 Săcele, Romania

F
Florești
 Saldus, Latvia

G
Ghelăuza
 Kandava, Latvia

I
Ialoveni

 Force, Italy
 Ineu, Romania
 Lesznowola, Poland
 Montefortino, Italy
 Pașcani, Romania
 Pocheon, South Korea
 Radnevo, Bulgaria
 Senec, Slovakia
 Tomești, Romania
 Topraisar, Romania

O
Ocnița
 Preiļi, Latvia

Orhei
 Talsi, Latvia

R
Rîbnița

 Chernyakhovsk, Russia
 Dmitrov, Russia
 Dyatkovsky District, Russia
 Hola Prystan, Ukraine

Rîșcani
 Pārgauja, Latvia

S
Slobozia Mare
 Florești, Romania

Soroca

 Bauska, Latvia
 Rēzekne, Latvia

T
Tiraspol

 Kaluga, Russia
 Kursk, Russia
 Leninsky (Minsk), Belarus
 Novosibirsk, Russia
 Santarém, Portugal
 Sukhumi, Georgia
 Ternopil, Ukraine
 Trondheim, Norway
 Tskhinvali, Georgia

References

Moldova
Moldova geography-related lists
Populated places in Moldova
Foreign relations of Moldova
Cities and towns in Moldova